The Mühlig-Hofmann Mountains is a major group of associated mountain features extending east to west for  between the Gjelsvik Mountains and the Orvin Mountains in Queen Maud Land, East Antarctica.

Discovery and naming
The Mühlig-Hofmann Mountains were discovered by the Third German Antarctic Expedition (1938-1939), led by Capt. Alfred Ritscher, and named for the division director of the German Air Ministry. They were remapped by the Norwegian Antarctic Expedition, 1956-1960.

Features

Glaciers
 Austreskorve Glacier
 Kvitholten Hill
 Flogeken Glacier
 Langflog Glacier
 Lunde Glacier
 Skålebreen
 Skålebrehalsen Terrace
 Sloket Glacier
 Tønnesen Glacier
 Vestreskorve Glacier
 Hamarglovene Crevasses

Mountains and ranges

 Ahlstad Hills
 Breplogen Mountain
 Høgsenga Crags
 Småkovane Cirques
 Buddenbrock Range
 Cumulus Mountain
 Jøkulkyrkja Mountain
 Jøkulfallet
 Jøkulhest Dome
 Kyrkjetorget
 Larsen Cliffs
 Kyrkjebakken Slope
 Kapellet Canyon
 Katedralen Canyon
 Djupedalshausane Peaks
 Festninga Mountain
 Austvollen Bluff
 Festningsporten Pass
 Gablenz Range
 Mount Grytøyr
 Skigarden Ridge
 Bjørn Spur
 Gessner Peak
 Habermehl Peak
 Håhellerskarvet
 Halsknappane Hills
 Hamarøya Mountain
 Huldreskorvene Peaks
 Kyrkjeskipet Peak
 Luz Range
 Snøtoa Terrace
 Mount Hädrich
 Mount Hochlin
 Mount Kropotkin
 Nikolayev Range
 Preuschoff Range
 Sloknuten Peak
 Snønutane Peaks
 Snønutryggen
 Thälmann Mountains

Other

 Djupedalen Valley
 Grinda Ridge
 Hamarskorvene Bluff
 Hoggestabben Butte
 Tvibåsen Valley
 Båsbolken Spur
 Jaren Crags
 Kaye Crest
 Kvea Valley
 Kvithamaren Cliff
 Kyrkjedalen Valley
 Kyrkjedalshalsen Saddle
 Langfloget Cliff
 Øvrevollen Bluff
 Småsponen Nunatak
 Snøbjørga Bluff
 Torbjørn Rocks
 Tussebrekka Slope
 Tverrseten Col

See also
 Extreme points of Norway
 List of mountains of Queen Maud Land
 Fimbulheimen
 Sprekkefjellet, a hill 9 km away from this location
 Stuttfloget Cliff
 Styggebrekkufsa Bluff

References

External links
 United States Geological Survey, Geographic Names Information System (GNIS)
 Scientific Committee on Antarctic Research (SCAR)

Mountain ranges of Queen Maud Land